This is a list of people from Coventry, a city in the West Midlands region of England. The list is arranged alphabetically by surname.


C
 Aimee Challenor (born 1997), politician and transgender activist

D

 Delia Derbyshire (1937-2001), composer of electronic music, creator of the theme music to Doctor Who

G
 Frederick Gibberd (1908–1984), English architect, town planner and landscape designer.
 Bobby Gould (born 1946), English former footballer and manager

H
 Vince Hill (born 1934), English traditional pop music singer and songwriter

J
 JAY1 (born 1998), British rapper and Songwriter

I
 Frank Ifield (born 1937), English-Australian country music singer and guitarist

K
 Richard Keys (born 1957), English sports presenter

L
 Philip Larkin (1922–1985), English poet, novelist, and librarian

M
 Reg Matthews (1933–2001), English football goalkeeper
  Brian Mitchell (born 1967), Australian politician

O
 Clive Owen (born 1964), actor

P
 Henry Parkes (1815-1896), statesman and founder of modern Australia

W
 Kevin Warwick (born 1954), cybernetics scientist
 Pete Waterman (born 1947), English record producer, songwriter, radio and club DJ and television presenter
 Frank Whittle (1907-1996), inventor of the jet engine

References

Coventry